The 44th Chess Olympiad was organised by the Fédération Internationale des Échecs (FIDE) in Chennai, the state capital of Tamil Nadu, India from 28 July to 10 August 2022. It consisted of open and women's tournaments, as well as several events designed to promote the game of chess.

The event was initially supposed to take place in Khanty-Mansiysk, Russia, along with the Chess World Cup 2019, but was later moved to Moscow and scheduled for the period from 5 to 17 August 2020. However, it was postponed due to the COVID-19 pandemic and then relocated to Chennai following Russia's invasion of Ukraine. This was the first Chess Olympiad to take place in India.

The event was hosted and managed in India by the AICF (All India Chess Federation). The current AICF President, Sanjay Kapoor was the President of the Organising Committee for the 44th Chess Olympiad, and AICF Secretary, Bharat Singh Chauhan was the Tournament Director.

The total number of participants was 1,737, with 937 in the Open and 800 in the Women's event. The number of registered teams was 188 from 186 nations in the Open section and 162 from 160 nations in the Women's section. Both sections set team participation records. The main venue of the Chess Olympiad was the convention centre at the Four Points by Sheraton, while the opening and closing ceremonies were held at the Jawaharlal Nehru Stadium. The Chief Arbiter of the event was France's International Arbiter Laurent Freyd.

Uzbekistan won the gold medal in the Open event, which was their first overall medal in the Chess Olympiads, while Ukraine claimed their second gold in the Women's event (having previously won in 2006). English player David Howell had the highest performance for an individual player in the Open event with a performance rating of 2898 (he scored 7½ out of a possible 8 points). Polish player Oliwia Kiołbasa had the highest individual performance in the Women's event with a performance rating of 2565 (she scored 9½ of a possible 11 points).

The 93rd FIDE Congress also took place during the Olympiad, at which Arkady Dvorkovich was re-elected as FIDE President and Viswanathan Anand was elected as FIDE Deputy President.

Bidding process 
Bidding for the Olympiad and the simultaneous FIDE Congress opened in December 2015; bids could be made in connection with those for the Chess World Cup 2019. Each city bid had to be submitted to FIDE by 31 March 2016, including details of the organising committee, finances, provision of amenities and stipends. Only one bid was submitted, from Khanty-Mansiysk (Russia), although the national federations of Argentina and Slovakia had previously expressed interest in bidding. The bid was approved at the 87th FIDE Congress in September 2016.

Changes to the host city 
In November 2019, in the opening ceremony of the FIDE Grand Prix in Hamburg, FIDE President Arkady Dvorkovich announced that the Chess Olympiad would be relocated from Khanty-Mansiysk to Moscow. The president of the Russian Chess Federation Andrey Filatov had stated earlier the same day that the two cities would likely co-host the event. Khanty-Mansiysk was to host the opening ceremony and the inaugural Chess Paralympics, for people with disabilities in teams representing blind, deaf and physically disabled players.

In February 2022, following the Russian invasion of Ukraine, FIDE decided to move the Chess Olympiad, FIDE Congress and Chess Paralympics away from Russia. Shortly after this announcement, the AICF expressed interest in hosting the events, in either Delhi, Gujarat or Tamil Nadu. On 15 March 2022, FIDE announced that Chennai, the capital of Tamil Nadu, would be the new host of the event.

Preparations 

The coordinating committee was headed by the Chief Minister of Tamil Nadu M. K. Stalin and included A. Raja (MP from Nilgiris), Udhayanidhi Stalin (MLA from Chepauk-Thiruvallikeni) three representatives of the AICF, the president of the Tamil Nadu State Chess Association and other representatives of the local authorities.

Venue 
The venue was the convention centre at the Four Points by Sheraton in Mahabalipuram near Chennai. This consisted of an existing banquet hall (Hall 1) and a newly constructed hall (Hall 2), which cost . Hall 1 hosted games played on the top 28 boards in the open section and the top board in the women's section, with other games played in Hall 2. Exhibition space was also provided.

The opening and closing ceremonies were held at the Nehru Indoor Stadium, part of the Jawaharlal Nehru Stadium complex. This was built in 1995 at a cost of ₹20 crore (then about €3.25 million) and has a capacity of 8,000 spectators.

Transport 
Around 125 buses, 100 SUVs and six luxury cars were used to transport players and dignitaries during the event. The road between Chennai International Airport and Mahabalipuram was widened and reconstructed to improve traffic flow, with one lane of the highway reserved for Olympiad traffic during the event.

Torch relay 
A torch relay was held prior to the event, the first for a Chess Olympiad. It started on 19 July at the Indira Gandhi Arena in New Delhi, where FIDE President Arkady Dvorkovich handed the torch to the Indian prime minister Narendra Modi, who passed it to former World Chess Champion Viswanathan Anand. The torch was then taken to 75 cities in 40 days, finishing in Chennai where it passed through Shore Temple. Related events involved the Indian sport mallakhamba. The torch arrived at the venue in Mahabalipuram on the morning of 27 July.

Security 
The Tamil Nadu Police deployed 4,000 police officers to provide security during the Olympiad, on special duty from 25 July to 10 August. The Greater Chennai Police deployed an additional 22,000 police officers during prime minister Narendra Modi's visit to the city on 28 July. Flying of drones and other unmanned aerial vehicles was banned in the city limits in the period 28–29 July.

Biosecurity 
Because the event was held during the COVID-19 pandemic in India, the Tamil Nadu Health Department deployed medical teams and 30 ambulances to perform COVID-19 screening at airports, hotels and venues. Nearly 1,000 doctors and other health personnel were engaged for the Olympiad. Thirteen hospitals in and around Old Mahabalipuram Road and East Coast Road were utilised.

COVID-19 PCR testing was performed on a randomly selected two per cent of all arriving flight passengers at the airport, including players, coaches, support staff and visitors. All passengers had to present a vaccine passport certifying they had received two doses of a COVID-19 vaccine, or a certificate of a negative PCR test taken within 72 hours before arrival. Thermal screening was applied to all players on a daily basis, with symptomatic cases being isolated, tested and treated. Due to the 2022 monkeypox outbreak, players from outside India were required to also be tested for monkeypox.

Food safety officials inspected food served every day in all hotels accommodating players. Due to the elevated risk of malaria and dengue fever, continuous fogging and spraying measures were deployed to prevent mosquito breeding. Additional hygiene training and inspection was arranged. Around 100 staff from other districts were used to monitor food safety measures in all hotels.

Ticketing 
To prevent cheating using chess engines, all electronic devices (including mobile phones) had to be deposited at a counter outside the halls.

The event

Opening ceremony 
The opening ceremony was held on 28 July at 16:00 IST (UTC+5:30) at the Nehru Indoor Stadium with an audience of more than 20,000 players, coaches and spectators. The opening address was given by Tamil Nadu Minister for Youth Welfare and Sport Development Meyyanathan Siva V. A musical show was performed, with Kamal Haasan narrating the history of Tamil Nadu, directed by Vignesh Shivan. Singers Dhee and Kidakuzhi Mariyammal performed the song "Enjoy Enjaami". A dance song, "Vanakkam Chennai, Vanakkam Chess". was also played. A flag parade was held with one player from each team. Pianist Lydian Nadhaswaram played classical and modern tunes, including a blindfold exhibition.

The event was formally opened by Indian prime minister Narendra Modi. In his speech, Modi discussed chess venues in Tamil Nadu and the Chathuranga Vallabhanathar Temple in Tiruvarur, where myth states God played chess with a princess. Chief Minister of Tamil Nadu M. K. Stalin also spoke, praising the organisation of the event in less than four months. He noted that the Olympiad would be held near the coastal town Sadurangapattinam, thought to be the home of chaturanga, a predecessor game to chess. FIDE president Arkady Dvorkovich also welcomed participants.

The five-time World Chess Champion Viswanathan Anand passed the Olympic LED illuminated torch to Modi, who passed it to Indian chess players R Praggnanandhaa and Gukesh D who "lit" the virtual Olympic cauldron.

Participating teams 
The event was contested by a total of 188 teams, representing 186 national federations, both records for a Chess Olympiad. India, as host country, was permitted to field three teams. The women's tournament featured 162 teams, also a record, representing 160 federations. Russia and Belarus were banned from taking part by FIDE as a result of the 2022 Russian Invasion of Ukraine. China declined to send a team. Pakistan boycotted the event and a team from Rwanda were prevented from attending by their own government. A team representing the Netherlands Antilles was permitted to compete, despite having dissolved itself in 2010, because the Curaçao Chess Federation remains officially registered as representing the country.

Notes

 Countries in italics denote those fielding teams in the open event only.
 Countries in bold denote those fielding teams in the women's event only.

Competition format and calendar 
The tournament was played in a Swiss system format. The time control for all games was 90 minutes for the first 40 moves, after which an additional 30 minutes were granted and increment of 30 seconds per move was applied. Players were permitted to offer a draw at any time. A total of 11 rounds were played, with all teams playing in every round.

In each round, four players from each team faced four players from another team; teams were permitted one reserve player who could be substituted between rounds. The four games were played simultaneously on four boards, scoring 1 game point for a win and ½ game point for a draw. The scores from each game were summed together to determine which team won the round. Winning a round was worth two match points, regardless of the game point margin, while drawing a round was worth 1 match point. Teams were ranked in a table based on match points. Tie-breakers for the table were i) the Sonneborn-Berger system; ii) total game points scored; iii) the sum of the match points of the opponents, excluding the lowest one.

Tournament rounds started on 29 July and ended with the final round on 9 August. All rounds began at 15:00 IST (UTC+5:30), except for the final round which began at 10:00 IST (UTC+5:30). There was one rest day at the tournament, on 4 August, after the sixth round.

All dates are IST (UTC+5:30)

Open event 

The open tournament featured five out of the top ten players from the FIDE rating list published in July 2022. World Champion Magnus Carlsen played for Norway. Former World Champion Viswanathan Anand decided not to play for India, acting as team mentor instead. Ian Nepomniachtchi and Ding Liren, who will contest the World Chess Championship 2023, both missed the tournament due to Russia's suspension and China's withdrawal, respectively. Other top players who skipped the Olympiad include France's Alireza Firouzja and Maxime Vachier-Lagrave, with the latter citing the unfavourable weather conditions, Teimour Radjabov withdrew from playing for Azerbaijan shortly before the start of the tournament, due to suffering after-effects of a COVID-19 infection that he contracted following the Candidates Tournament 2022. Lê Quang Liêm also did not play, because Vietnam only entered the women's event. Richárd Rapport could not compete, as he was in the process of switching federation from Hungary to Romania. Fabiano Caruana, Levon Aronian and Wesley So, all top ten in the FIDE rankings, played for the United States.

In the absence of Russia and China, the United States were regarded as favourites due to their average rating of 2771, higher than any other team. Viswanathan Anand described the team as "breathtaking", and Anish Giri said that the US team "not dominating the Olympiad would be a shocker". The host nation India had the second strongest team with an average pre-tournament rating of 2696, while Norway had the third highest average rating of 2692. Other pre-tournament favourites included Spain and Poland. The young squads of Germany, Uzbekistan and India's second team were also expected to be competitive.

Open summary 

Uzbekistan won the gold medal in the open event, with a total of 19 match points. Their eight wins and three draws made them the only undefeated team in the tournament. Silver medallists Armenia also scored 19 points, but lost the tie-break largely due to their loss to the Uzbek team in the ninth round. The second Indian team won the bronze medal following a strong performance by 16-year-old Gukesh D, who won eight consecutive games in the first eight rounds but blundered a loss to Nodirbek Abdusattorov in their match with the Uzbek team, which proved decisive. Three teams scored 17 match points (seven wins, three draws and one loss each): the first Indian team came fourth, the United States fifth, and Moldova sixth. The heavily favoured US team failed to win a medal due to lacklustre performances from Fabiano Caruana, who suffered three losses, and Levon Aronian, who won only one game in the tournament.

The highest scoring individual player in the Open event was David Howell, playing for England on board three, who scored 7½ out of a possible 8 points (7/8, seven wins and one draw) with a performance rating of 2898. Individual gold medals were also awarded to Gukesh D of India-2 who scored 9/11 with a performance rating of 2867 on board one, Nihal Sarin also of India-2 who scored 7½/10 with a performance rating of 2774 on board two, Jahongir Vakhidov of Uzbekistan who scored 6½/8 with a performance rating of 2813 on board four, and Mateusz Bartel of Poland who played the tournament as a reserve player and scored 8½/10 points with a performance rating of 2778.

Notes

Average ratings calculated by chess-results.com based in July 2022 ratings.

All board medals were given out according to performance ratings for players who played at least eight games at the tournament. David Howell on the third board had the best performance of all players in the tournament with a rating of 2898.

Women's event 

The women's tournament featured three of the ten top players according to the FIDE rating list published in July 2022: sisters Mariya Muzychuk and Anna Muzychuk plus Nana Dzagnidze.

Since China withdrew and Russia was suspended the other six players of the top ten were missing: Hou Yifan, highest rated woman player in the world; Ju Wenjun, current Women's World Champion and Tan Zhongyi from China, and Alexandra Kosteniuk, Aleksandra Goryachkina and Kateryna Lagno from Russia. Between them, Russia and China had won the gold medal at nine of the eleven previous Olympiads.

Their absence made India the first seed, with an average rating of 2486. Ukraine, with Former Women's World Champion Anna Ushenina, were the second highest rated team averaging 2478, while Georgia were seeded third with 2475. Other medal contenders were expected to be Poland France, Azerbaijan, the United States and Germany.

Women's summary 

Ukraine won the gold medal with 18 match points from seven wins and four draws, making them the only unbeaten team. It was their second title, having previously won in 2006. Silver medallists Georgia also finished with 18 match points but had a worse tie-breaker. The bronze medal went to the first India team, who were leading the tournament by two points after seven rounds, before losing to Poland in the ninth round and the United States in the eleventh round, finishing on 17 match points. The United States and Kazakhstan had the same score as India but due to weaker tie-breakers finished in fourth and fifth place, respectively.

Oliwia Kiołbasa had the highest individual score in the Women's event, playing for Poland on board three, who scored 9½/11 (nine wins, one draw and one loss) and a performance rating of 2565. Individual gold medals were also won by Pia Cramling of Sweden with 9½/11 and a rating performance of 2532 on board one, Nino Batsiashvili of Georgia with 7½/10 and a rating performance of 2504 on board two, Bat-Erdene Mungunzul of Mongolia who scored 7½/10 with a rating performance of 2460 on board four, and Jana Schneider of Germany who played as a reserve player before scoring 9/10 points with a rating performance of 2414.

Notes

Average ratings calculated by chess-results.com based in July 2022 ratings.

All board medals were given out according to performance ratings for players who played at least eight games at the tournament. Oliwia Kiołbasa on the third board had the best performance of all players in the tournament with a rating of 2565.

Gaprindashvili Trophy 
The Nona Gaprindashvili Trophy, created by FIDE in 1997 and named after former women's World Champion Nona Gaprindashvili (1961–78), is given to the teams with the best combined performance in the Open and Women's tournaments (sum of their positions in both results tables). It was won by the first teams of India, with the United States being runners up.

FIDE Congress 
The 93rd FIDE Congress was held during the Olympiad, from 31 July to 9 August, with its General Assembly on 7 and 8 August.

FIDE presidential election 
The FIDE presidential election took place on 7 August 2022. Four sets of candidates were approved by the FIDE Electoral Commission, each consisting of a joint ticket for president and deputy president:
 Arkady Dvorkovich (president, incumbent) and Viswanathan Anand (deputy president)
 Andrey Baryshpolets (president) and Peter Heine Nielsen (deputy president)
 Inalbek Cheripov (president) and Lewis Ncube (deputy president)
 Bachar Kouatly (president) and Ian Wilkinson (deputy president).

Each ticket had to meet several requirements in order to be approved: it had to be submitted two months before the General Assembly; the candidates for president and deputy president could not be from the same member federation; and the ticket required endorsements from five member federations including one from each of the four FIDE continents, but no more than eight federations in total, with each federation being entitled to endorse only one ticket. A candidate ticket of Enyonam Sewa Fumey (president) and Stuart Fancy (deputy president) was rejected by FIDE because it had received support from member federations of Africa (Burkina Faso, Egypt, Togo and Senegal), Asia (Papua New Guinea) and America (Haiti) but not from Europe.

Inalbek Cheripov withdrew a few days before the election. On election day, each of the remaining candidates was allowed to speak to delegates for 15 minutes before the voting, in an order determined by drawing lots. Kouatly withdrew during his speech. Dvorkovich & Anand won in a landslide, winning 157 of the 179 federations who voted. Baryshpolets & Nielsen came second with 16 votes.

Marketing

Mascot 
The official mascot was named "Thambi", a chess knight wearing a vēṭṭi (the ethnic Tamil male attire) and a white shirt. He was depicted with folded hands, extending the Tamil greeting "Vanakkam". The mascot appeared on billboards, statues and posters. Commentators compared Thambi to 'Appu', the mascot for the 1982 Asian Games.

Promotional activities 
Buses in Chennai were branded with the promotional slogan "Namma Chess, Namma Pride" (trans. Our Chess, Our Pride). Buses in Coimbatore and Tiruchirappalli also carried marketing for the event. The mascot Thambi was put at the "Namma Chennai" selfie point on the East Coast Road; a contest was held for images with the mascot posted on social media, with prizes of free tickets to the opening ceremony. Billboards were installed at major bus stops, and the event was also promoted at Chennai Metro stations.  A private school in Perambur erected a  giant chessboard, with students playing the pieces and  statues of the Thambi mascot, opened by P. K. Sekar Babu, Tamil Nadu's Minister of Hindu Religious and Charitable Endowments Department

India Post issued a postage stamp featuring the Olympiad. It was unveiled during a ceremony on International Chess Day.

Chennai's Napier Bridge was painted with a chessboard pattern, which divided opinion. While some commentators liked the artwork, others raised concerns that the pattern was disorienting, especially for people with anxiety disorder. The chessboard pattern also led to traffic congestion as people thronged to the bridge to take selfies and record videos for social media.

Side tournaments

Checkmate Coronavirus 
FIDE held an online event in May 2020 titled 'Checkmate Coronavirus'. This consisted of 2,762 tournaments held simultaneously over a 30-day period, played by 120,000 unique participants from over 140 countries. The various winners of the event were awarded masterclasses with current Grandmasters, free tickets to the Olympiad, and/or souvenirs and memorabilia.

Rapid tournament 
Immediately prior to the Olympiad, on 24 July, a rapid chess tournament was held in Hall 1 and Hall 2, with 1,414 participants. All games from 707 boards were broadcast live online. The winner of the event was Indian grandmaster Vishnu Prasanna, who scored a perfect 9 points from a possible 9.

Sponsorship 
Sponsors included Tech Mahindra, Smartwater, Indian Oil, Titan and Chessable.

Broadcasting 
The Olympiad was broadcast live on an official YouTube channel, with commentary by grandmasters Judit Polgár and Mihail Marin. In India, television broadcast was on the Doordarshan channel. Chess24 provided online streaming commentary by grandmasters Peter Leko and Peter Svidler. Chess.com streamed the event through their ChessTV, Twitch and YouTube channels. ChessBase India also streamed the event live on their YouTube channel.

Concerns and controversies

Doping restrictions 

During the 2010s, Russian international teams in multiple sports engaged in widespread doping (illegal use of performance enhancing drugs), with the complicit inaction of the Russian Anti-Doping Agency. An investigation by the World Anti-Doping Agency (WADA) led to a November 2019 recommendation that Russia should be banned from hosting all major events for a period of four years. As part of their position that chess is a sport, FIDE is affiliated with WADA and implements drug testing at Chess Olympiads following WADA guidelines.

The Russian Chess Federation denied that WADA's recommendations applied to the Chess Olympiad. FIDE officially responded to WADA that the contracts for the two affected tournaments—Candidates Tournament 2020–2021 and the 44th Chess Olympiad—had already been signed and therefore they could not be moved. FIDE also argued that the events qualified for an exemption specified by WADA because they were the only valid bids to organise each event.

COVID-19 pandemic 

With the COVID-19 pandemic spreading around the world in early 2020, FIDE announced in March 2020 that the Chess Olympiad would be postponed. They planned to reschedule it in the summer of 2021 at the same host. In December 2020 with the pandemic still ongoing, FIDE formally cancelled the event and planned to reorganise it for 2022.

Even after a two-year delay, the pandemic still affected participation in the Olympiad. The Chinese team, which won gold medals in both events at the 2018 Chess Olympiad, withdrew due to the pandemic. Azerbaijan's Teimour Radjabov, the winner of the Chess World Cup 2019, did not play, due to the after-effects of a COVID-19 infection that he contracted after competing in the Candidates Tournament 2022.

Russian invasion of Ukraine 
Russia invaded Ukraine in February 2022, with some troops entering via Belarus. Within days, FIDE announced that the Olympiad would no longer take place in Russia. In March 2022, FIDE followed a recommendation by the International Olympic Committee to suspend Russia and Belarus from participation in international tournaments, including the Olympiad. Although their teams were not allowed to compete, the Russian and Belarusian national federations were permitted to take part in the FIDE Congress, submit candidates and vote in the FIDE presidential election held during the Olympiad.

Many Russian chess players disapproved of the invasion. Some decided to leave the country, switch federations, or play under the FIDE flag instead of the Russian flag. Forty-four top Russian players signed an open letter addressed to Russian president Vladimir Putin, stating their opposition to the war. Signatories included Ian Nepomniachtchi, Alexandra Kosteniuk, Peter Svidler, Andrey Esipenko and Daniil Dubov. Dmitry Andreikin, Alexandr Predke and Vladimir Fedoseev, who all played in the FIDE Grand Prix 2022 held in February and March, did not return to Russia and moved to North Macedonia, Uzbekistan and Spain, respectively. Daniil Yuffa, Kirill Alekseenko and Nikita Vitiugov also moved to Spain, while Alexey Sarana stayed in Belgrade after participating in a tournament there. Alina Kashlinskaya transferred her affiliation to Poland, playing for them at the Olympiad.

Team flags
Competitors representing Afghanistan used the flag used by the Taliban militant group, which took control of the country in 2021, instead of the flag of the Islamic Republic of Afghanistan which was still officially recognised by FIDE. Images of the Taliban flag at the 2022 Chess Olympiad were widely circulated by Taliban officials and supporters on social media.

Kosovo declared independence from Serbia in 2008, and the Kosovo Chess Federation has been a full member of FIDE since 2016. However, India does not recognise the nation, so the hosts banned the flag of Kosovo at the Olympiad. The Kosovo team were therefore forced to play under the FIDE flag.

Pakistan's withdrawal 
The torch relay passed through parts of Jammu and Kashmir and Ladakh, in the disputed region of Kashmir. The route stuck to locations administered by India as union territories, but those locations are also claimed by Pakistan (see Kashmir conflict). The Pakistan team had already arrived in India for the Olympiad. Nevertheless, the Pakistani federation withdrew from the event in protest, describing the torch route as "provocative".

Rwanda's team blocked
A dispute over the financial management and governance at the Rwandan Chess Federation led to Rwanda's Ministry of Sport blocking the Rwandan team's participation in the Olympiad. The ministry and the country's Olympic committee have refused to recognise the chess federation since December 2021.

See also 

 Chess Olympiad
 Chess World Cup 2019
 FIDE Online Chess Olympiad 2020
 FIDE Online Chess Olympiad 2021

Notes

References

External links 

 
 Results:
 Open event
 Women's event

44th Chess Olympiad
Chess Olympiads
2022 in chess
Chess Olympiad
International sports competitions hosted by India
2022 in Indian sport
Chess Olympiad
Chess Olympiad
Chess Olympiad
Sports competitions in Chennai
2020s in Tamil Nadu
Chess in India